The Hamul class were a class of destroyer tenders that were initially constructed as attack cargo ships for the United States Navy during World War II. They operated from 1941 to 1969.

Design and description

Initially both ships were commercial cargo ships of the C3 type taken over by the United States Navy during World War II and converted to attack cargo ships. They were powered by steam generated from two Foster Wheeler boilers turning geared turbines creating . The ships were armed with a single /38-caliber gun, four single-mounted /50 cal. guns and four  guns. They had a complement of 857 officers and enlisted personnel.

Ships in class

Notes

Citations

References
 
 
 
 
 
 

 
 
 
Auxiliary depot ship classes